Julian Russell Story (September 8, 1857 – February 24, 1919) was an American painter.

Early life
Story was born on September 8, 1857 in Walton-on-Thames, Surrey to American parents. He was the youngest child of sculptor William Wetmore Story and Emelyn (née Eldredge) Story. Among his siblings was brother Thomas Waldo Story, also a well known sculptor, and sister, Edith Marion (née Story), Marchesa Peruzzi di Medici, the wife of Marquess Simone Peruzzi di Medici.

He was educated at Eton and Brasenose College, Oxford University, England.

Personal life
In 1891, Story was married to the renowned American soprano Emma Eames, the daughter of an international lawyer. Eames was born in Shanghai, China, and raised in Portland and Bath, Maine. They divorced in 1907 and Emma later married Emilio de Gogorza.

In 1909, he married Elaine Sartori Bohlen, the daughter of Victor Alexander Sartori and Annie Lawrence Gordon. Together, they were the parents of:

 Emelyn McClellan Florence Story (1912–1946), who married Edward Maynard Ewer, in 1931.
 Vera Felicity Story (1918–2001), who married Henry Latrobe Roosevelt Jr., a son of Assistant Secretary of the Navy Henry L. Roosevelt, in 1937.

He died in Philadelphia at age 61. He was buried at Chelten Hills Cemetery in Philadelphia.

Artworks

See also
 List of painters by name
 Lists of painters by nationality

References

External links

 John Russell Story paintings at the BBC

19th-century American painters
19th-century American male artists
American male painters
World's Columbian Exposition
American portrait painters
English portrait painters
1857 births
1919 deaths
People educated at Eton College
20th-century American painters
20th-century American male artists